KQCH (94.1 FM) is a Top 40 (CHR) radio station serving the Omaha, Nebraska metropolitan area. It is owned by SummitMedia. KQCH's studios are located on Mercy Road in Omaha's Aksarben Village, while its transmitter is located off North 72nd Avenue and Crown Point at the Omaha master antenna farm.

History

Early years (1941-1959) 
The 94.1 frequency was originally KOAD, owned by the Omaha World-Herald, and launched on 94.3 FM in 1941. This lasted until 1949, when it moved to 94.1 and went silent.

MOR (1959-1968) 
In 1959, it returned to the air as KMEO, where it had an MOR format.

Rock (1968-1979) 
In 1968, it changed to an album rock format under the call letters KOWH-FM.

R&B (1979-1982) 
By 1979, KOWH-FM switched formats to R&B as KYNN-FM under then-new owner Great Empire Broadcasting.

Country (1982-2002)
In 1982, it flipped to country. In September 1983, it became WOW-FM and retained the country format, where it enjoyed a successful 17-year run. Journal Broadcasting would buy out Great Empire in 1999. On October 10, 2000, WOW-FM changed its call letters and re-branded to KSSO, "Kiss Country", which prompted a cease and desist letter from Clear Channel Communications – who had previously trademarked and service-marked the "Kiss" name and had recently launched a "Kiss" station in nearby Lincoln, Nebraska. A couple of months later, they modified the call letters and became KMXM "Max Country" on January 2, 2001.

Rhythmic hits (2002-2004) 
KQCH's origins began on May 21, 1999 at 97.7 FM, when it flipped from Adult Contemporary to Rhythmic Contemporary as "Channel 9-7-7". The station became a serious challenger to Top 40 Mainstream KQKQ-FM during its three years on the weak 97.7 frequency.

On May 3, 2002, at Noon, Journal Broadcasting moved KQCH and its rhythmic-leaning Top 40 format from 97.7 to 94.1 and was relaunched as "Channel 94-1".

Top 40 (2004-present) 
The station continued in a Rhythmic direction until 2004, when it shifted to a more mainstream (and slightly adult-leaning) direction after KQKQ flipped to Adult Top 40. In early September 2012, KQCH received direct competition when iHeartMedia (then Clear Channel)'s KQBW flipped to Top 40.

Journal Communications and the E. W. Scripps Company announced on July 30, 2014 that the two companies would merge to create a new broadcast company under the E. W. Scripps Company name that owned the two companies' broadcast properties, including KQCH. The transaction was completed in 2015. Scripps exited radio in 2018; the Omaha stations went to SummitMedia in a four-market, $47 million deal completed on November 1, 2018.

References

External links
Channel 94.1's website
Sunday Night Shrink Rap with Dr. Jim Website

QCH
Contemporary hit radio stations in the United States
Radio stations established in 1960
1960 establishments in the United States